Joseph Charles Van Horne (January 3, 1921 – August 27, 2003) was a politician in New Brunswick, Canada, and the leader of the Progressive Conservative Party of New Brunswick between 1966 and 1967.

A lawyer and hotel owner in the Campbellton area, Van Horne ran for the federal Progressive Conservatives in the riding of Restigouche-Madawaska in a 1955 by-election following the death of Liberal Member of Parliament Joseph Gaspard Boucher. Van Horne won the election, breaking a 22-year Liberal hold on the riding.

While in Parliament, Van Horne successfully lobbied the federal and provincial governments to build a bridge between Campbellton and Pointe-à-la-Croix, Québec. The bridge opened in October 1961 and is currently named for him.

In 1966, after the resignation of Cyril Sherwood, Van Horne successfully ran for leader of the provincial Progressive Conservative Party. His campaign against Liberal Premier Louis Robichaud in the 1967 provincial election is considered one of the most flamboyant and extravagant in New Brunswick history. Traversing the province in a Cadillac, wearing a cowboy hat, and with Don Messer providing entertainment at each stop, Van Horne frequently attacked Robichaud's mixed Acadian and First Nations heritage and said that "these half-breeds shouldn't drink liquor". Critics also accused Van Horne of being too vague on his promises. Robichaud was re-elected, and Van Horne resigned as leader. He attempted to regain the leadership at the 1969 party leadership convention but lost to Richard Hatfield.

Van Horne remained in the Legislative Assembly and served as Minister of Tourism in the Cabinet of Richard Hatfield between 1970 and 1972 when he was fired from cabinet for going over budget. In 1975, he left politics entirely after pleading guilty to accepting a bribe over the purchase of park lands and receiving a two-year suspended sentence.

References

Sources
 Journal of the New Brunswick Legislative Assembly, December 9, 2003
 "Ethnicity and Accommodation in  the New Brunswick party system" by William Cross and Ian Stewart. Journal of Canadian Studies, Winter 2002.
 Louis J. Robichaud: A Not So Quiet Revolution by Michel Cormier, translated by Johnathan Kaplansky. Faye Editions, 2004.
 The Right Fight: Bernard Lord and the Conservative Dilemma by Jacques Poitras. Goose Lane Editions, 2004.

External links
 

1921 births
2003 deaths
Members of the Executive Council of New Brunswick
Members of the House of Commons of Canada from New Brunswick
Progressive Conservative Party of Canada MPs
People from Campbellton, New Brunswick
Canadian people of Dutch descent
New Brunswick political party leaders